The Women's 4x5 km relay B1-2 event was one of the events held in cross-country skiing at the 1984 Winter Paralympics in Innsbruck, Austria.

Two teams from two nations competed in the event.

Results

Final

References 

4x5 km relay B1-2